The Old town of Ghadames is the old city of the modern city of Ghadames, Libya  and one of Libya's major desert cities. Called the "Jewel of the Desert" the site is registered as a UNESCO World Heritage Site since 1986.

Architecture 

The old city of Ghadames is a city with an oasis. It is divided into seven neighborhoods with separate public places all connected to make one big city. The architectural design was based on the Saharan environment and inhabitants reflection to the dry climate. Its interconnected structure helped locals with space usage and insulation. Specific materials were used for protection against harsh weather and to provide light and ventilation to the four floored housings.

References 

Ghadames
World Heritage Sites in Libya
World Heritage Sites in Danger